Abuko National Park is a nature reserve in the Gambia lying south of the town of Abuko. It is a popular tourist attraction and was the country's first designated wildlife reserve.

History
The area was first accorded some measure of protection in 1916 when the Lamin Stream, which flows through the reserve, was fenced to form a water collection point. The enclosure of the stream saw an increase in the stock of wildlife and flora in the forest.

In 1967 wildlife officer Eddie Brewer and his daughter Stella Marsden visited the area and realised the conservation importance of the forest and its wildlife.  Brewer made a request to the government for the area to be protected. In 1968 the Department of Wildlife, now the Gambia Department of Parks and Wildlife Management, was established at the reserve.

Flora
The flora consists of a typical savanna and gallery forest landscape. Typical trees, up to thirty feet high, are: oil palm, mahogany, iroko and anthocleista procera.

Fauna
There are three monkey species: vervet monkeys, red colobus monkeys and patas monkeys. Other mammals include antelope, squirrel, porcupine, African palm civets, mongooses,  galagos, and several types of rodents, including cane rats.

Among the reptiles at the park are monitor lizard, Nile crocodile, dwarf crocodile, spitting cobra, black cobra, python, puff adder and green mamba. More than 270 bird  species have been recorded in the forest. There are also numerous butterflies and moths.

At one end of the site are several enclosures which serve as an orphanage for needy animals, including an enclosure in which a pack of hyenas is held.

References

National parks of the Gambia
Protected areas established in 1968